Nizhnetashevo (Tübänge Taş) is a rural locality (a village) in Abitovsky Selsoviet, Meleuzovsky District, Bashkortostan, Russia. The population was 76 as of 2010. There is 1 street.

Geography 
Nizhnetashevo is located 39 km east of Meleuz (the district's administrative centre) by road. Andreyevsky is the nearest rural locality.

References 

Rural localities in Meleuzovsky District